The Export–Import Bank of Korea, also commonly known as the Korea Eximbank (KEXIM), is the official export credit agency of South Korea.

Overview 

The bank was first established in 1976. Its primary purpose is to support South Korea's export-led economy by providing loans, financing mega projects and thereby facilitating economic cooperation with other countries.

Government funds 
The bank manages the following government funds:

 Economic Development Cooperation Fund (EDCF): The EDCF evaluates and implements aid projects in developing countries.
 Inter-Korean Cooperation Fund (IKCF): The IKCF oversees an economic cooperation program with North Korea and serves as a clearing settlement bank with the Foreign Trade Bank of North Korea.

Aid programs 
On January 6, 2013, the bank announced its decision to provide loans and credit guarantees worth US$917 million to entertainment and food firms over the next three years to promote the spread of the Korean Wave in foreign countries. A spokesman representing the bank told reporters that K-pop, Korean dramas, as well as traditional Korean cuisine have huge growth potential, and that exporters of such cultural content deserve more investment and financial support.

References

External links 

 Official website of the Korea Eximbank

Banks of South Korea
Export credit agencies
Foreign trade of South Korea
South Korean companies established in 1976
South Korean foreign aid
Banks established in 1976